Ander Cantero Armendariz (born 9 January 1995) is a Spanish footballer who plays for SD Eibar as a goalkeeper.

Club career
Born in Pamplona, Navarre, Cantero joined CA Osasuna's youth setup in 2002, aged seven. He made his senior debut with the reserves on 29 September 2012, starting in a 0–2 Segunda División B home loss against CD Izarra.

On 13 August 2014, Cantero was loaned to Zamora CF still in the third division. After being sparingly used, he moved to Real Madrid C the following 30 January, still in a temporary deal.

On 7 July 2015, Cantero signed a three-year deal with another reserve team, Villarreal CF B also in the third tier. After spending his first season as a backup to Aitor Fernández, he subsequently became an undisputed starter for the B-side.

Ahead of the 2017–18 campaign, Cantero was promoted to the first team due to the injuries of both Sergio Asenjo and Andrés Fernández, and acted as a backup to Mariano Barbosa. On 25 October 2017 he made his debut with the main squad, starting in a 0–1 loss at SD Ponferradina for the season's Copa del Rey.

On 6 July 2018, Cantero was loaned to Segunda División side CF Rayo Majadahonda, for one year. He spent the majority of the campaign as a backup to longtime incumbent Basilio, and suffered team relegation.

On 9 July 2019, Cantero agreed to a four-year contract with CD Lugo, also in the second division. On 25 July 2021, he signed a three-year deal with SD Eibar, recently relegated to division two.

References

External links

1995 births
Living people
Footballers from Pamplona
Spanish footballers
Association football goalkeepers
Segunda División players
Segunda División B players
Tercera División players
CA Osasuna B players
Zamora CF footballers
Real Madrid C footballers
Villarreal CF B players
Villarreal CF players
CF Rayo Majadahonda players
CD Lugo players
SD Eibar footballers
Spain youth international footballers